Nikolayevka is a rural locality (a selo) in Nikolayevsky Selsoviet, Karmaskalinsky District, Bashkortostan, Russia. The population was 854 as of 2010. There are 10 streets.

Geography 
Nikolayevka is located 13 km north of Karmaskaly (the district's administrative centre) by road. Ulyanovka is the nearest rural locality.

References 

Rural localities in Karmaskalinsky District